Van Horne may refer to:

People
 Van Horne (surname), including a list of people with the name

Buildings
 Van Horne House, listed on the National Register of Historic Places in Somerset County, New Jersey
 Van Horne Mansion, house in Montreal, Quebec
 Walrath-Van Horne House, listed on the National Register of Historic Places in Montgomery County, New York

Places
 Van Horne, Iowa, United States

See also
Van Hoorn (surname)
Van Horn (disambiguation)
Van der Hoorn, surname